Mercy High School is a private, Roman Catholic, all-girls high school in Middletown, Connecticut located within the Roman Catholic Diocese of Norwich.

History
In 2018 a petition was made to allow same-sex couples to attend the school dance. Despite coverage on the topic from the Middletown Press and the Hartford Courant, as well as support from the students and their creation of a change.org petition, the issue ultimately went unresolved by the school. The petition received over 1,800 signatures in 2 days, but was taken down by the student due to the administration "strongly advising me to give it up," per a note by the petitioner.

References

External links
 
 Roman Catholic Diocese of Norwich

Catholic secondary schools in Connecticut
Buildings and structures in Middletown, Connecticut
Schools in Middlesex County, Connecticut
Girls' schools in Connecticut
Middletown, Connecticut